Abangares River (Spanish: Rio Abangares) is a river of Costa Rica.

References

Rivers of Costa Rica